Meisamia (/mejˈsæmiˈjæ/; Mejsämijä; Azerbaijani Turkic: Meysəmiyə/مېيٛسەمييٛە; Farsi: میثمیه) is a village in Üzümdil, in the Central District of Varzaqan County, East Azerbaijan Province, Iran. At the 2006 census, its population was 135, in 35 families.

Etymology 
The village is called Meisamia because it belongs to Meisam Khan. The previous name was Hamamly and was subsequently renamed to Meisamia.

The name Meisamia is divided into two components: Meisam (Name of the Khan) and -ia suffix that created the content of "Place, Land and Country".

Economy 
Products of this village are cereals. People living on agriculture and cattle and they do crafts village is Kilim.

Geography 
Is mountainous and temperate zone.

Demographics
According to official census of 2006, the population of Meisamia is about 135. The majority of the village's population are Turks.

Language 

Today, the predominant language spoken in Meisamia is Azerbaijani Turkic, which belongs to the Turkic languages family. Azerbaijani is a member of Oghuz branch of Turkic language, and it is closely related to Turkish and Turkmeni. It is known to speakers as Turki.

Religion 
The majority of people are followers of Islam.

Culture and art

Music 

The popular music between Meisamia people is Ashyq that play the Qopuz, a form of lute. Their songs are partly improvised around a common base.

Cuisine 

Some traditional Meisamia dishes are:

Āsh is a kind of soup which are prepared with bouillon, various vegetables, carrot, noodle and spices.

Dolma is a traditional delicious Azerbaijani food. It is prepared with eggplant, capsicum, tomato or zucchini filled with a mixture of meat, split pea, onion and various spices.

Main sights & Landscape 
there are many sights in Meisamia that which include:

 Meisamia castle hill
 Pishik dashy rock, is rock that is like Cat
 Dägirmän Boǧazy
 Kasabulaq, spring in the form of two nested bowls

Meisamia Castle Hill 

Meisamia Castle Hill The Meisamia Castle Hill was discovered to the geographical location of the central part of Meisamia, No. 25218, dating back to the First millennium BC in the Meisamia.

Property stolen 
In an area called the Meisamia village Aq Dashlyq cemetery that Tombstone block with a variety of shapes and lines, and written and of course before it has owned over 100 pieces of the local language is called the Qoch Dashy in 1985 after years of neglect of relevant people and organizations and so-called historical books knack smugglers loot and plunder were completely destroyed and burnt to the ground and has been.

Tourism 
There are some of the most important tourist destinations in Meisamia;

References 

This article is based on the Azerbaijani Turkic article of the village.

Towns and villages in Varzaqan County